Cuttalosa Creek is a tributary of the Delaware River in Bucks County, Pennsylvania.

Course
Cuttalosa Road crosses over the stream five times.

Etymology
The name Cuttalosa was derived from the Lenape name Quatalossi for their village nearby.

Geology
Cuttalosa Creek lies on the Stockton Formation, a layer of bedrock consisting of light-gray to light brown sandstone, siltstone, and mudstone, laid down in the Late Triassic.

History
At one time, the Lenape occupied a village in the valley. Later, there were several mills along the creek. One was built by Samuel Armitage in 1752 which operated until his descendant, Amos Armitage, closed the mill in 1929.

Municipalities
Bucks County
Solebury Township

Crossings and Bridges

See also
List of rivers of the United States
List of rivers of Pennsylvania
List of Delaware River tributaries

References

Rivers of Bucks County, Pennsylvania
Rivers of Pennsylvania
Tributaries of the Delaware River